Tirana 6 is one of the 24 administrative units in Tirana.

Neighborhoods
 Kombinati
 Yzberishi

References

Tirana 06